Joseph Lambert Massart (19 July 1811 – 13 February 1892) was a Belgian violinist who has been credited with the origination of the systematic vibrato. He compiled The Art of Working at Kreutzer's Etudes, a supplement that contains 412 fingerings and bowings taken from his time studying with Rodolphe Kreutzer. He was an excellent String quartet player who gave many delightful chamber concerts, having also played Beethoven's Kreutzer Sonata in A minor with Franz Liszt on 23 May 1843.

Biography
Massart was born in Liège, and was taught music first by his father Joseph Marie and later by his father's eldest brother Jean-Joseph, a disciple of Leonard-Joseph Gaillard. With the death of his uncle, Massart studied under the guidance of Ambroise Delaveux who then secured for him, from the local authorities of Liège, a scholarship at the Conservatoire de Paris, where his admission was then blocked by Luigi Cherubini on the grounds that Massart was a foreigner. He became then the favorite pupil and protégé of Kreutzer and his younger brother, Auguste Kreutzer, who took his brother's post as professor at the conservatory upon his death.

Despite being sponsored by King William I of the Netherlands, he was not accepted at the Conservatoire de Paris until 1829 because of his foreign status. He was appointed professor of violin at the Conservatoire de Paris in 1843 and subsequently taught there for 47 years as music professor. Among his pupils were Fritz Kreisler, Eugène Ysaÿe, Léon Reynier, Henryk Wieniawski, Alfred De Sève, Isidor Lotto, Teresina Tua, and Charles Martin Loeffler.

References

Further reading
Cutter, Benjamin: How to Study Kreutzer: A Handbook for the Daily Use of Violin Teachers and Students on the Internet Archive Website

External links
 Famous Violinists of To-day and Yesterday by Henry Charles Lahee on Project Gutenberg

Belgian classical violinists
Academic staff of the Conservatoire de Paris
Conservatoire de Paris alumni
Musicians from Liège
1811 births
1892 deaths
19th-century classical violinists
Male classical violinists
19th-century Belgian male musicians